Quchi Bashi (also Romanized as Qūchī Bāshī; also known as Kānī ‘Āzīz-e Qūshī Bāshī and Qūjī Bāshī) is a village in Howmeh-ye Sarpol Rural District, in the Central District of Sarpol-e Zahab County, Kermanshah Province, Iran. At the 2006 census, its population was 179, in 34 families.

References 

Populated places in Sarpol-e Zahab County